Bride of the Noisemakers is the fifth album—and second live album—by Bruce Hornsby with his touring band the Noisemakers. The double album, released in 2011, consists of 25 songs recorded between 2007 and 2009.

The album debuted on Billboard 200 at No. 125, selling around 4,000 copies in the first week.  It has sold 16,000 copies as of May 2016.

Track listing
All songs by Bruce Hornsby, except where noted.

Disc one
 "Cyclone" (Robert Hunter, Hornsby) – 5:40
 "Country Doctor" – 7:59
 "Funhouse" – 7:45
 "This Too Shall Pass" – 5:03
 "Circus on the Moon" – 7:09
 "Defenders of the Flag" (John Hornsby, Bruce Hornsby) – 5:03
 "Intro/Variation II (excerpt)/Catenaires (excerpt)" (Bobby Read/Anton Webern/Elliott Carter) – 2:04
 "Talk of the Town/Charlie, Woody 'n' You" (Hornsby/Charles Ives, Hornsby) – 6:17
 "What the Hell Happened" – 3:38
 "Fortunate Son/Comfortably Numb" (Hornsby/Roger Waters, David Gilmour) – 10:20
 "Levitate" (Thomas Newman, Hornsby) – 4:58
 "Little Sadie/White Wheeled Limousine/Just One More" (Traditional/Hornsby/George Jones) – 13:08

Disc two
 "The Wind Up/Big Rock Candy Mountain/Candy Mountain Run" (Keith Jarrett/Traditional/Hornsby) – 7:36
 "Line in the Dust" – 5:43
 "Shadow Hand" – 4:16
 "Tango King" – 7:11
 "Resting Place" – 10:16
 "Michael Raphael" (Chip deMatteo, Hornsby) – 3:36
 "Sonata, Movement IV (excerpt)" (Samuel Barber) – 2:18
 "Gonna Be Some Changes Made" – 5:48
 "Dreamland" – 8:22
 "The Good Life" – 4:26
 "Cartoons & Candy" – 2:54
 "Swan Song" – 6:42
 "Standing on the Moon/Halcyon Days" (Jerry Garcia, Robert Hunter/Hornsby) – 8:55

Personnel 
 Bruce Hornsby – lead vocals, acoustic piano, accordion, dulcimer
 John "J. T. " Thomas – keyboards, organ, backing vocals
 Doug Derryberry – electric guitars,  acoustic guitars, mandolin, backing vocals
 R. S. Hornsby – guitar ("Standing on the Moon")
 J. V. Collier – bass 
 Sonny Emory – drums
 Bobby Read – saxophones, bass clarinet, backing vocals

Production 
 Produced and Mixed by Bruce Hornsby and Wayne Pooley 
 Mastered by Randy Merrill at Sterling Sound (New York, NY).
 Cover Photography – Pat Martin 
 Other Photography – Katherine Fisher, Sean Smith and Carey Wilhelm.
 Management – Marc Allan
 Road Crew – Reggie Bankston, Peter Banta, Vic Goel, Caldwell Gray, Jeremaine Israel, Mo Jackson, Charles Keith and Wayne Pooley.

Charts

References 

2011 live albums
Bruce Hornsby albums